Woolley's false antechinus (Pseudantechinus woolleyae), also known as Woolley's pseudantechinus, is a species of small carnivorous marsupial belonging to the family Dasyuridae. It is found in the Australian state of Western Australia, primarily in the Pilbara, Ashburton and Murchison regions.

Taxonomy
Woolley's false antechinus was, like most false antechinuses, long believed to be a form of the fat-tailed false antechinus, which it closely resembles. It was not given full species status until 1988. The common and species names honour Dr Patricia Woolley, an Australian expert on these dasyurid marsupials.

Description
Woolley's false antechinus is the largest false antechinus and its behaviour is little known. It has a breeding life of two or more years, unlike many of its relatives which live for a short time. Births occur in September–October and the young are sexually mature at 10 months.

Woolley's false antechinus is coloured rich brown above and buff below. It has a flattened tail and chestnut patches behind its ears.

Habitat
Woolley's false antechinus inhabits rocky hillsides, usually vegetated with acacia scrub or spinifex grass. It is found in the western area of Western Australia.

References

External links
Image of the type specimen's skull

Dasyuromorphs
Mammals of Western Australia
Marsupials of Australia
Mammals described in 1988
Taxa named by Darrell Kitchener